Chef Menteur is an instrumental rock band from New Orleans, Louisiana in the United States with heavy leanings towards the style of ambient music. It was formed in 1998 by Alec Vance (of Shinola) and Jim Yonkus, both of whom were looking to explore new sounds from different music worlds: electronica, post-rock, experimental noise and drone, and improvisational jazz. The current line-up includes Dan Haugh from the bands godheadSilo and Smoke and Smoke.

The original lineup was Vance on guitar and Farfisa organ and Yonkus on bass, with both members of the duo also playing other synths, manipulating samples and drum machines. They also run their own custom video projections at live shows from self-produced DV footage. The sound of the band has become gradually more guitar-and-drums oriented over time and less sample-based and reliant on computer-synchronized beats, and shows feature psychedelic improvisations.

Their 2005 album We Await Silent Tristero's Empire was released by the artist-run independent label Backporch Revolution to international critical acclaim .

The band reformed in New Orleans after Hurricane Katrina, and was one of the first bands to play in the city following the lifting of the evacuation order allowing residents to return. They were instrumental in releasing the Proud To Swim Home compilation which raised money for musicians who lost instruments in the flood.

They released the album "The Answer's In Forgetting" in 2007, at which point Yonkus left the band and was replaced by Brian Abbott. In 2008 the band was nominated for Best Electronic Act in The Best of the Big Easy Awards . The trio of Vance, Haugh, and Abbott spent the next three and a half years recording their next  album named "East of the Sun & West of the Moon."

In April 2011, Phil Rollins of The Gubernatorial Candidates became a member of Chef Menteur while the new record went into final mixes and production. "East of the Sun & West of the Moon" was released on Backporch Revolution on March 31, 2012, in double LP and digital formats.

Chef Menteur counts among its fans noted actress Grace Zabriskie.

Band members

As of April 2016, the full-time membership of Chef Menteur consists of:

B. Aubrey Freeman (bass, keyboards)
Dan Haugh (drums)
Phil Rollins (guitar, keyboards)
Alec Vance (guitar, keyboards, vocals)

Other past and contributing members of the band have included Brian Abbott (bass, guitar, keyboards, trumpet), Bryan Killingsworth (keyboards, sampling, programming, guitar), Chris Sule (drums), Mike Mayfield (drums, keyboards; also known for his work in the Buttons), retro-minimalist musician potpie, and Jim Yonkus (bass).

Discography
Vive La France! (CD-EP) - released 2003 on Backporch Revolution
We Await Silent Tristero's Empire'' (CD) - released 2005 on Backporch Revolution
"Empires Sans Frontières" - track contributed to WTUL's Songs from the Basement 2 compilation, 2003
"Oceanic No. 23" (with Alexandra Scott) - track contributed to WTUL's Songs from the Basement 4 compilation, 2006
"Aquavitae" - track contributed to Proud To Swim Home: A Backporch Revolution Compilation for New Orleans, 2006
"Charlie Don't Surf (pinkysqueak mix)" - track contributed to Proud To Swim Home: A Backporch Revolution Compilation for New Orleans, 2006The Answer's In Forgetting''' (CD) - released 2007 on Backporch Revolution
"East of the Sun & West of the Moon" (double LP) - released March 31, 2012 on Backporch Revolution
"North of Tomorrow & South of Yesterday" - digital album released March 31, 2012 on Backporch Revolution, available as reward for [Kickstarter] backers of "East of the Sun & West of the Moon"
"Force Majeure" - digital album released June 14, 2014 on Backporch Revolution and on cassette only on Waypoint Tapes
"III" (3-disc compilation including 3 previous albums: "East of the Sun & West of the Moon", "North of Tomorrow & South of Yesterday", and a remastered "Force Majeure") - released March 25, 2015 on Sunrise Ocean Bender

External links
Official website
Chef Menteur page on Backporch Revolution site
Interview with Alec Vance of Chef Menteur at My Spilt Milk

Rock music groups from Louisiana
American instrumental musical groups
Musical groups from New Orleans
American post-rock groups